The 2023 Cork Premier Senior Hurling Championship is scheduled to be the fourth staging of the Cork Premier Senior Hurling Championship and the 135th staging overall of a championship for the top-ranking hurling teams in Cork. The draw for the group stage placings took place on 11 December 2022. The championship is scheduled to run from June to October 2023.

St. Finbarr's will enter the championship as the defending champions.

Team changes

To Championship

Promoted from the Cork Senior A Hurling Championship
 Fr. O'Neill's

From Championship

Relegated to the Cork Senior A Hurling Championship
 Na Piarsaigh

Participating team

Clubs

The seedings were based on final group stage positions from the 2021 championship.

Group A

Group A table

Group B

Group B table

Group C

Group C table

Knockout stage

Relegation playoff

Quarter-finals

Semi-finals

Final

References

External links

 Cork GAA website

Cork Senior Hurling Championship
Cork
Cork Premier Senior Hurling Championship
Cork Premier Senior Hurling Championship